The third season of Chicago Med, an American medical drama television series with executive producer Dick Wolf, and producers Michael Brandt, Peter Jankowski, Andrew Schneider and René Balcer (uncredited), was ordered on May 10, 2017. The season premiered on November 21, 2017. This season marks the final regular appearance of main character Sarah Reese Portrayed By Rachel DiPillo The season concluded on May 15, 2018, and contained 20 episodes.

Cast

Main
 Nick Gehlfuss as Dr. Will Halstead, Attending Emergency Physician
 Yaya DaCosta as April Sexton, RN
 Torrey DeVitto as Dr. Natalie Manning, Pediatrics/Emergency Medicine Fellow
 Rachel DiPillo as Dr. Sarah Reese, Psychiatry Resident
 Colin Donnell as Dr. Connor Rhodes, Cardiothoracic Surgery Fellow
 Brian Tee as LCDR Dr. Ethan Choi, Attending Emergency Physician
 Marlyne Barrett as Maggie Lockwood, RN, ED Charge Nurse
 Norma Kuhling as Dr. Ava Bekker, Cardiothoracic Surgery Fellow
 S. Epatha Merkerson as Sharon Goodwin, Chief of Services
 Oliver Platt as Dr. Daniel Charles, Chief of Psychiatry

Recurring

Special guest star
 Malcolm McDowell as Dr. Marvin Jaffrey
 Corbin Bleu as Tommy

Crossover characters

Episodes

Production

Casting
After making her debut in the season 2 finale as Dr. Ava Bekker, Norma Kuhling returned in a main role for season 3. Michel Gill appeared in multiple episodes as Bob Haywood, Dr. Reese's (Rachel DiPillo) estranged father, who is admitted to the hospital as a patient. On November 22, it was announced that Arden Cho would be joining the cast in a recurring role as Emily Choi, Ethan's (Brian Tee) adopted sister. Malcolm McDowell guest-stars as Dr. Jaffrey, a distinguished heart surgeon and Dr. Bekker's mentor.

Ratings

Home media
The DVD release of season three was released in Region 1 on August 28, 2018

References

External links
 
 

2017 American television seasons
2018 American television seasons
Chicago Med seasons